Hồ Minh Thu (born 15 June 1929) is a Vietnamese former sports shooter. He competed at the 1968 Summer Olympics and the 1972 Summer Olympics. He also competed at the 1970 and 1974 Asian Games.

References

External links
 

1929 births
Possibly living people
Vietnamese male sport shooters
Olympic shooters of Vietnam
Shooters at the 1968 Summer Olympics
Shooters at the 1972 Summer Olympics
People from Bạc Liêu Province
Asian Games medalists in shooting
Shooters at the 1970 Asian Games
Shooters at the 1974 Asian Games
Asian Games bronze medalists for Vietnam
Medalists at the 1970 Asian Games
20th-century Vietnamese people